Lochanhead railway station served the settlement of Lochanhead, Dumfries and Galloway, Scotland from 1859 to 1965 on the Castle Douglas and Dumfries Railway.

History 
The station opened on 7 November 1859 by the Glasgow and South Western Railway. To the west was the goods yard and the signal box when it opened in 1878. The station closed for passengers on 25 September 1939 and closed in May 1947 to goods traffic.

References

External links 

Disused railway stations in Dumfries and Galloway
Railway stations in Great Britain opened in 1859
Railway stations in Great Britain closed in 1939
Former Glasgow and South Western Railway stations
1859 establishments in Scotland
1947 disestablishments in Scotland